Baan Sinlapin, The Artist's House is an art gallery and puppet theater situated at 315 Wat Tong Salangam, Phet Kasem 28, Thanon Phet Kasem, Phasi Charoen, Bangkok, Thailand. The building dates back over 200 years, and was previously the residence of the Raksamruat family. The last heir of the family sold the property to Mr. Chompol Arkkapantanon, who subsequently renovated it into an art gallery.

Overview 
The wooden building is L-shaped with two floors. The second floor is a large gallery space displaying both art work and photographs. The first floor is divided into different areas. Every Sunday, there is a free jewelry making class open to anyone interested. Tourists can buy souvenirs such as postcards from the sell zone. There is also a puppet theater, with a show at 2 p.m. daily except on Wednesday. The Artist's House is an important learning center for students or people who are interested in art work.

References 

Buildings and structures in Bangkok
Tourist attractions in Bangkok